Hans: Het Leven voor de dood (Hans, Life Before Death) is a 1983 Dutch documentary feature film by Louis van Gasteren about the life of the young composer  (1939-1963) and those who knew him intimately. The film deals intimately with the children of the Nazis. It won the Golden Calf for Best Feature Film in 1983. Award of the Dutch film critics, 1983; the Belgian film critics Award, 1984; Best Dutch Documentary 1980–1990. 35 mm, b/w & color, 155 min.

The film is about the harrowing life of the musician, poet and actor Hans van Sweeden (1939-1963), who ended his life at the age of 24. Simultaneously, the film offers a poignant portrait of his contemporaries in the turbulent fifties and sixties. Louis van Gasteren received a Golden Calf.

References

External links
 
 Hans Het Leven Voor de Dood at New York Times

1983 films
Dutch documentary films
Films directed by Louis van Gasteren
1983 documentary films
1980s Dutch-language films